Naing Htoo Aung is a Burmese politician who currently serves as the secretary of the Ministry of Defense of NUG. He is also the member of Committee Representing Pyidaungsu Hluttaw - CRPH. 

He was elected as a Pyithu Hluttaw MP for Natogyi Township in both 2015 Myanmar general election and 2020 Myanmar general election.

Early life and education
Naing Htoo Aung was born in 1988 in the Mandalay Region of Myanmar. He graduated
M.P.A, B.Sc (Physics) and Dip in International Law.

Political career
In the 2015 Myanmar general election, he contested the Pyithu Hluttaw from Natogi Township parliamentary constituency. He served as a Pyithu Hluttaw member from Natogyi Township until 2020 Myanmar general election in which he was re-elected from the same township. After the 2021 Myanmar coup d'état, he joined CRPH as a member and currently serve as a secretary for Ministry of Defence - NUG.

He also serves as a member of the NLD Central Committee (Reserve) and as the Treasurer of NLD Mandalay Region Executive Committee.

Duties of Hluttaw Representative
After being elected in 2015 Myanmar general election, he served as a member of the International Relations Committee of the Pyithu Hluttaw, as a member of committee on the Rights of Women and Children , and as a member of the Parliamentary Capacity Building Advisory Council.

He also became a member of the Joint Committee on ASEAN Parliaments of the Pyidaungsu Hluttaw in 2015.

References

National League for Democracy politicians
Mandalay University alumni

1988 births
Living people
People from Mandalay Region